Katie Brambley (born February 5, 1979) is a Canadian former swimmer who specialized in middle-distance freestyle events.  She captured two bronze medals from the 1995 Pan American Games, and later represented Canada at the 2000 Summer Olympics.  During her sporting career, Brambley also trained for the Pacific Dolphins Swim Club, under head coach Tom Johnson, while taking up a bachelor's degree in political science at the University of British Columbia.

Brambley made her official debut at the 1995 Pan American Games in Mar del Plata, Argentina, where she collected two bronze medals each in the 400-metre freestyle (4:18.74), and as a member of the Canadian squad, in the 4×200-metre freestyle relay (8:08.25).

At the 2000 Summer Olympics in Sydney, Brambley competed only in the 4×200-metre freestyle relay.  On the fifth night of the Games, the Canadians pulled off a fifth-place finish in the final with a time of 8:02.65, nearly five seconds off the Olympic record set by the Americans.  Teaming with Jessica Deglau, Jen Button and Shannon Shakespeare in heat one on the morning prelims, Brambley swam the third leg and recorded a split of 2:02.40 to post a seventh-seeded time for the Canadians in 8:07.12.

References

External links
Profile – Canadian Olympic Team
Athlete Profile – Canoe.ca (2000 Summer Olympics)

1979 births
Living people
Canadian female freestyle swimmers
Olympic swimmers of Canada
Pan American Games silver medalists for Canada
Pan American Games bronze medalists for Canada
Swimmers from Victoria, British Columbia
Swimmers at the 1995 Pan American Games
Swimmers at the 2000 Summer Olympics
Pan American Games medalists in swimming
Medalists at the 1995 Pan American Games
20th-century Canadian women
21st-century Canadian women